Victory in Europe Day is the day celebrating the formal acceptance by the Allies of World War II of Germany's unconditional surrender of its armed forces on Tuesday, 8 May 1945, marking the official end of World War II in Europe in the Eastern Front, with the last shots fired on the 11th. Russia and some former Soviet countries celebrate on 9 May. Several countries observe public holidays on the day each year, also called Victory Over Fascism Day, Liberation Day or Victory Day. In the UK it is often abbreviated to VE Day, or V-E Day in the US, a term which existed as early as September 1944, in anticipation of victory.

The end of all combat actions was specified as 23:01 Central European Time, which was already 9 May in eastern Europe, and thus several former Soviet bloc countries—including Russia and Belarus, as well as some former Yugoslav countries like Serbia—celebrate Victory Day on 9 May.

History

Adolf Hitler, the Nazi leader, had committed suicide on 30 April during the Battle of Berlin, and Germany's surrender was authorised by his successor, Reichspräsident Karl Dönitz. The administration headed by Dönitz was known as the Flensburg Government. The act of military surrender was first signed at 02:41 on 7 May in SHAEF HQ at Reims, and a slightly modified document, considered the definitive German Instrument of Surrender, was signed on 8 May 1945 in Karlshorst, Berlin at 22:43 local time.

Upon the defeat of Germany, celebrations erupted throughout the Western world, especially in the United Kingdom and in North America. More than one million people celebrated in the streets throughout the UK to mark the end of the European part of the war. In London, crowds massed in Trafalgar Square and up the Mall to Buckingham Palace, where King George VI and Queen Elizabeth, accompanied by their daughters and Prime Minister Winston Churchill, appeared on the balcony of the palace before the cheering crowds. Churchill went from the palace to Whitehall, where he addressed another large crowd:

Churchill then asked Ernest Bevin to come forward and share the applause. Bevin said, "No, Winston, this is your day", and proceeded to conduct the people in the singing of "For He's a Jolly Good Fellow". Later, Princess Elizabeth (the future Queen Elizabeth II) and her sister Princess Margaret were allowed to wander incognito among the crowds and take part in the celebrations. The 2015 film A Royal Night Out was inspired by Elizabeth and Margaret mingling with the public that night.

In the United States, the event coincided with President Harry Truman's 61st birthday. He dedicated the victory to the memory of his predecessor, Franklin D. Roosevelt, who had died of a cerebral hemorrhage less than a month earlier, on 12 April. Flags remained at half-staff for the remainder of the 30-day mourning period. Truman said of dedicating the victory to Roosevelt's memory and keeping the flags at half-staff that his only wish was "that Franklin D. Roosevelt had lived to witness this day". Later that day, Truman said that the victory made it his most enjoyable birthday. Great celebrations took place in many American cities, especially in New York's Times Square.

Tempering the jubilation somewhat, both Churchill and Truman pointed out that the war against Japan had not yet been won. In his radio broadcast at 15:00 on 8 May, Churchill told the British people, "We may allow ourselves a brief period of rejoicing (as Japan) remains unsubdued". In America, Truman broadcast at 09:00 and said it was "a victory only half won".

National celebrations 
VE Day is celebrated across European nations as public holidays and national observances.

Austria 
The Festival of Joy is an Austrian event held in honor of VE Day. The Austrian Mauthausen Committee (MKÖ) has organised the Festival of Joy since 2013, in cooperation with the Austrian Government and the City of Vienna. The festival is held annually on Heldenplatz.

On the eve of the diamond jubilee in 2020, Russian President Vladimir Putin, at the request of Chancellor Sebastian Kurz, gave a live address broadcast on Austrian TV channel ORF.

France 
France celebrates VE Day on 8 May, being a national and public holiday. Orléans simultaneously celebrates both VE Day and the anniversary of the Siege of Orléans being lifted by French forces led by Joan of Arc during the Hundred Years War on this date.

Germany 
Events in Berlin occur on 8 May to commemorate those who fought against Nazism in the German Resistance and died in World War II. In 2020, a regional holiday in Berlin occurred on 8 May to mark the 75th anniversary of surrender. East Germany celebrated 8 May as its Tag der Befreiung (Day of Liberation), first celebrated under Walter Ulbricht's government in 1950 and repeated annually until the fall of communism. Between 1975 and 1990, it was Tag des Sieges (Victory Day).

Poland 
8 May is known in Poland as "Narodowy Dzień Zwycięstwa" (National Victory Day). Poland officially recognised 9 May from 1945 until 2014, and on 24 April 2015, Poland officially recognised National Victory Day. On 8 May 1945, a meeting of the Council of Ministers was held, debating whether to establish the holiday on 8 May (proposed by Marshal Michał Rola-Żymierski) or 10 May (proposed by the government). Finally, in Poland, the National Day of Victory and Freedom was established by a decree of 9 May.  From 1946 to 1989, it was celebrated with Russian traditions being a socialist state at the time. The main celebrations were carried out at Plac Zwycięstwa or Plac Defilad in Warsaw (most notably in 1985). After 1990, no official ceremonies were organized, however many cities and military units together with local governments organized their own festivities. The Russian minority in Poland continues to celebrate 9 May traditions to this date. At the end of March 2015, due to the upcoming 70th anniversary of the end of World War II in Europe, the President of the Institute of National Remembrance Łukasz Kamiński sent a letter to the Speaker of the Sejm requesting the change from 9 to 8 May. On 24 April, the Sejm adopted the Act on National Victory Day celebrated on 8 May, at the same time abolishing the National Day of Victory and Freedom celebrated on 9 May.

United Kingdom 
In the United Kingdom VE Day is not an annual public holiday. In 1995 and 2020 the bank holiday was moved from the preceding Monday to 8 May to commemorate the 50th and 75th anniversaries of VE Day, respectively.

Other commemorative events 
: In Belgium the commemoration of the termination of World War II since 1974 is part of the Armistice of 11 November 1918 (Dutch: Wapenstilstandsdag), an annual national holiday. Every year on this day there is in presence of the king a truce-ceremony at the Tomb of the Unknown Soldier near the Congress Column in Brussels, at first to commemorate the victims of the First world war and subsequently those of World War II and all other wars worldwide.
: Since the Dissolution of Czechoslovakia in 1993, the Czech Republic has officially recognized 8 May as Victory Day (Den vítězství) Liberation Day (Den osvobození). In recent years the liberation of Plzeň by American forces has been commemorated on 5 May. From 1948 to 1993, the  Czechoslovak Republic celebrated 9 May, which was then celebrated with a military parade of the Czechoslovak People's Army (ČSLA) on Letná every five years. 
: 9 May is Europe Day which celebrates "peace and unity in Europe", on the anniversary of the 1950 Schuman Declaration.
 Baltic states: Estonia, Latvia and Lithuania officially commemorate 8 May, but do not commemorate 9 May since it marked the Soviet occupation for these states. Despite this, the local Russian communities still informally celebrate 9 May. Russian diplomats, other representatives from the Commonwealth of Independent States and the local politicians of Russian origin usually take part.

List of associated holidays

Soviet Victory Day

The instrument of surrender signed 7 May 1945 stipulated that all hostilities must cease at 23:01 (CET), 8 May 1945. Since that point in time would be on 9 May in local time in the Soviet Union, most Soviet states including Russia celebrated Victory Day on 9 May.

Gallery

See also 

 Timeline of World War II
 Time of remembrance and reconciliation
 Victory Day
 Victory Day Parades
 Victory over Japan Day
 Stunde Null

Bibliography

References

External links 

Records from the UK Parliament Collections
 WWII: VE Day, May 8, 1945 – slideshow by Life magazine (archived)
 Rare audio speeches of the famous historical persons of the USSR, etc.
  by Leon Charney on The Leon Charney Report.

Aftermath of World War II
May observances
Victory days
1945 in Europe
Norwegian flag flying days